Bobby Nelson may refer to

 Bobby Nelson former professional wrestler and businessman
 Bobbie Nelson (1931–2022), country and jazz pianist, sister of Willie Nelson
 Bobby Nelson Poe, rockabilly musician
 Officer Bobby "Hot Dog" Nelson, a fictional police officer on CHiPs portrayed by actor Tom Reilly
 Bobby Nelson, former mayor of Huntington, West Virginia
 Bobby Nelson, an actor who appeared in Hollywood western films including Roaring Ranch, The Red Rope, and Partners (1932 film)

See also
 Bob Nelson (disambiguation)
 Robert Nelson (disambiguation)
 Nelson (surname)